Rajouri is a municipality in Jammu and Kashmir, India.

Rajouri or Rajori or Rajuri may refer to several places in India.

Jammu and Kashmir
 Rajouri district
 1947–1948 Rajouri massacre
 Rajouri Tawi River
 Rajouri Airport
 Rajouri (Vidhan Sabha constituency)

West Delhi
 Rajouri Garden, a neighborhood in West Delhi
 Rajouri Garden (Delhi Assembly constituency)
 Rajouri Garden metro station

Maharashtra
 Rajuri, Ahmednagar